The  was a period of political upheaval in Japan that occurred after the death of Emperor Meiji in 1912. During the twelve-month period following the emperor's death, the Japanese government was led by three different prime ministers as the government attempted to restore the balance between the influence of Japan's elder statesmen (the genrō) and that of the Japanese public, as embodied in the Meiji Constitution.

Beginnings

Following the death of the Emperor Meiji on July 30, 1912, Crown Prince Yoshihito ascended to the Chrysanthemum Throne. The final years of Emperor Meiji's rule saw increased government spending, notably for overseas investments and defense, with little credit or reserves available to cover it. When Prime Minister Saionji Kinmochi, who was appointed Prime Minister by Emperor Meiji and continued in that post after his death, attempted to cut defense spending, Army Minister Uehara Yūsaku resigned in protest. The constitution required that the Army Minister to be an active-duty general; however, no eligible general of the Imperial Army was willing to serve. Unable to form a cabinet, Saionji resigned on December 21, 1912.

The emperor appointed Katsura Tarō, a former army general, who had served as Prime Minister twice before and a member of the genrō, to form the new government. Katsura was not a popular choice with the public, which believed he focused his interests more on the military than on the rest of the people. Soon after taking office, Katsura was faced with a ministerial defection of his own, when the Navy sought an increased budget to fund the construction of new battleships and threatened to withhold the appointment of a Navy Minister as a negotiating tactic. Unlike his predecessor, Katsura went directly to the emperor, who issued an edict that the Navy must provide a minister.

Popular uprising
The opposition political parties (particularly the Rikken Seiyūkai and Rikken Kokumintō) saw that as proof of Katsura's lack of commitment to constitutional government, and they joined forces with journalists and businessmen to form the Movement to Protect Constitutional Government. Katsura responded by suspending the Diet on three occasions and by forming his own political party, the Rikken Dōshikai. Popular protest nevertheless spread, and on February 10, 1913, thousands of protesters rioted in Tokyo, threatening the Diet building, setting fire to police stations and vandalizing pro-government newspaper offices.

Support for Katsura in the Diet fell, and he lost a vote of no confidence, the first such occurrence in Japan. Katsura resigned on February 20, 1913, and was replaced by Yamamoto Gonnohyōe, a former navy admiral.

Aftermath
It was the ability of the military to withhold appointment of Army or Navy ministers that was the greatest Achilles heel of the Meiji Constitution. That power, more than any single other issue, led to military domination over civilian government in the 1930s and 1940s.

References

Politics of the Empire of Japan
1913 in Japan
1913 in politics